Ted Collins (born 28 January 2003) is an English professional footballer who plays as a goalkeeper for Colchester United.

Club career
Collins is a youth product of Colchester United who has spent time on loan at Holland F.C. and Maldon & Tiptree, before making his professional debut for Colchester United at the age of 19 on 29 January 2022, coming on as a second-half substitute for Shamal George after he was sent off in a 1-1 draw with Swindon Town at the Jobserve Community Stadium.

Collins joined Potters Bar on a one month loan, to get more playing time.

After coming back from his loan spell, Collins has been named on the bench on various occasions. He was named on the bench on the 30 July 2022 against Northampton Town.

References

External links

2003 births
Living people
English footballers
Association football goalkeepers
Colchester United F.C. players
Maldon & Tiptree F.C. players
English Football League players
Isthmian League players